Cleyton is a name. People with that name include:
Boka (footballer) (born 1988), Brazilian football forward, full name Cleyton Coelho dos Santos
Cleyton Amaral (born 1989), Brazilian football midfielder, full name Cleyton da Silva Reis
Cleyton (footballer, born 1983), Brazilian-Greek football midfielder, full name Cleyton Alexandre Henrique Silva
Cleyton (footballer, born 1984), Brazilian football forward, full name Cleyton Campos de Melo
Cleyton (footballer, born 1990), Brazilian football midfielder, full name Cleyton Rafael Lima da Silva

See also
Clayton (disambiguation)
Cleiton (disambiguation)